Nigel S. Wright (born May 18, 1963) is a Canadian businessman and lawyer. He served as the thirteenth Chief of Staff of the Office of the Prime Minister of Canada, from September 2010 to May 2013  and is a Managing Director in the London office of Onex Corporation. Wright left the Prime Minister's Office after it was reported that he had lied about using his own money to cover Senator Mike Duffy repay the government for housing expenses that were, at the time, the subject of media and political controversy.

Early life
Wright was born in Hamilton, Ontario. He was adopted by an engineering technician, was raised in Burlington and spent some time in England. His parents were not wealthy. He graduated "With High Distinction" from the University of Toronto's Trinity College with a B.A. degree in Politics and Economics, where his classmates included Jim Balsillie, Malcolm Gladwell, Tony Clement, Andrew Coyne, Patricia Pearson, and author and political strategist John Duffy (not related to Mike Duffy). Wright was noted early on as a talented student. A political opponent and former classmate said that "back in the day, the question was 'Will Nigel be on the Supreme Court or be prime minister?' He worked harder than anybody and he was pretty much the smartest guy in the room." Jim Balsillie, the co-founder of BlackBerry Ltd, remembered thinking that he would have to "seriously up [his] inspiration levels if [he was] going to keep up with this kid." English-Canadian author Malcolm Gladwell recalls him as "an exceedingly decent, sweet and good-natured person", who appeared more mature and directed than his peers. "He just seemed like he had a much clearer sense of who he was than the rest of us."

At college, Wright was a campus activist for Brian Mulroney and co-founded The University of Toronto Magazine; as editor, he emerged as an admirer of Margaret Thatcher. Wright went on to earn an LL.B (Honours) at the University of Toronto Law School in 1988 and LL.M. at Harvard Law School. Robert Prichard, chair of Torys LLP and former head of University of Toronto's law school, called Wright "among the very best and brightest of his generation."

Often described by peers as a reclusive yet diligent 'workaholic', he has run half-marathons every morning for decades, suggesting an "unbelievably strong sense of control".

Personal faith
He has served as sub-deacon and warden of the Anglican Church of Canada, and is a proponent of the Anglo-Catholic movement, which asserts the Catholic roots of Anglicanism; he attends St. Barnabas Church of the Diocese of Ottawa.

In Toronto, people who know him from his work at St. Thomas's Anglican Church say he is a straight arrow, honourable and committed to public service.

As a young man, Wright contemplated joining the Anglican priesthood. During his time as a subdeacon at St. Thomas's Anglican Church, he was granted semi-private audiences with Pope Benedict XVI, and his predecessor, John Paul II. He accompanied a group led by Father Raymond J. de Souza, Roman Catholic chaplain at Queen's University, on a tour of holy sites in Israel.

Early years in politics
In 1984, Wright was asked by Prime Minister Brian Mulroney to go on hiatus from the University of Toronto Faculty of Law and work for Charley McMillan, his senior policy adviser. Wright took the job, and after returning to graduate from Toronto Law and then earning a Master of Laws from Harvard Law School, he returned to work as policy coordinator for Mulroney before Kim Campbell became Prime Minister.

Charitable work
Wright has committed his time to three major charities: LOFT Community Services, which provides housing for people in need; Out of the Cold, a multi-denominational program for the homeless; and Camp Oochigeas, a Muskoka facility that caters to children with cancer. As board chair, Wright spearheaded a major fundraising campaign. He sits on an advisory committee, and previously volunteered a week of his summer vacation every year to work with children on the site. He also sat on the board of the Mastercard Foundation, which funnels millions of dollars into micro-financing ventures in the developing world.

During his work in Prime Minister's Office, Wright pulled back from active participation but was known to have asked staff members who travel to collect shampoo bottles provided by hotels for use in a women's shelter.

Career

Law
After earning a BA Wright considered a career in academia but instead chose to be a lawyer. He joined Davies Ward Phillips & Vineberg and was made a partner with the firm after only five years, the minimum number of years then allowed.

Business
While Wright was working on an acquisition deal for Onex Corporation he impressed chief executive officer Gerry Schwartz who took him under his wing. At Onex, Canada's largest private-sector employer, Wright received several promotions, finally becoming a managing director. At Onex he served on several subsidiary boards:
 a director of Indigo Books & Music from 2001 to April 1, 2006. 
 vice president of Spirit Holdings from December 2004 to November 2006 and its Secretary and Treasurer from December 2004 to June 2006. 
 a director of Spirit Holdings in February 2005. 
 a director of Res-Care from June 2004 to November 7, 2006. 
 an executive officer of Magnatrax Corporation. 
 a director of Hawker Beechcraft, the direct parent company of Hawker Beechcraft Acquisition Company LLC from March 2007 to October 22, 2010. 
 a vice president of Spirit AeroSystems and named a director in February 2005.

Wright rejoined Onex in July 2014 as a managing director in the buyout firm's offices in London, England.

Politics
Involved in Conservative politics from his days in college, he gravitated between the Progressive Conservative and Reform parties for years, trying to draft Stephen Harper to unite the then-divided right-wing forces. He was eventually successful and became a founding director of the Conservative Fund Canada, the party's financial arm, and a director of Preston Manning's think tank in Calgary. In 2010, Wright was drafted by Stephen Harper to replace Guy Giorno as his chief of staff. In accepting the position, Wright left behind a seven-figure salary for a job described by Derek Burney as "exhilarating but more strenuous than anything else I did in the public or private sector". The appointment attracted pointed criticism and questions about his ties to Bay Street; many in the opposition feared that he was too close to the private sector. During his appointment hearing, New Democratic Party MP Pat Martin told him that "Every move you make, every breath you take puts you in a conflict of interest." Before starting the job, he had to negotiate with the Ethics Commissioner an "ethical wall" designed to insulate him from his holdings and other interests.

Chief of staff
As Prime Minister Harper's right-hand man, the "elusive" Wright became one of the most powerful players in Ottawa. He led many of Harper's big priorities, from the high-profile talks about the trans-Pacific free trade zone, to drafting the policy that limits foreign investment by state-owned enterprises in the oil sands. He was instrumental in the negotiating of skills training arrangement with the provinces and took over the International Trade file from minister Ed Fast.

Wright disclosed in writing to investigators that during his time in the Prime Minister's Office, he did not file a single expense claim, paying all his flights, hotels, meals and other costs from his own pocket. Investigators were told that it cost him tens of thousands of dollars, but, thanks to his corporate career, he could afford it, and  that Wright held the belief that taxpayers should not bear the cost of his position if he was able legitimately to fund it himself.

In the Hill Times annual ranking of the top 100 Most Influential People in Government and Politics, Wright placed sixth in 2012  and in Maclean's 25 Most important People in Ottawa he placed fifth in 2012.

Senate expense scandal and resignation

Wright wrote a personal cheque of $90,172 to Senator Mike Duffy, covering the cost of residency expenses. At the time, Duffy was under intense media pressure over these expenses. A Conservative Party spokesman confirmed the money was a gift from Wright, with no expectation of repayment. Shortly before his resignation, the Ethics Commissioner confirmed it was investigating Wright for his repayment of these expenses. Wright then left government service. On October 28, 2013, PM Harper stated in an interview that Wright did not resign, but was in fact dismissed. Wright decided to stay in Ottawa until the RCMP finished its investigation of the Senate.

On April 15, 2014, the RCMP dropped its nearly year-long investigation into Wright, saying "the evidence gathered does not support criminal charges against Mr. Wright." The RCMP would later lay 31 charges on Duffy on July 17, 2014.; Duffy was exonerated of all 31 charges on April 21, 2016 and Wright's actions were condemned by Justice Charles Vaillancourt as "mindboggling and shocking" and "unacceptable" "in the context of a democratic society".

References 

Living people
Trinity College (Canada) alumni
University of Toronto Faculty of Law alumni
Harvard Law School alumni
Canadian Anglo-Catholics
Chiefs of staff of the Canadian Prime Minister's Office
Onex Corporation people
People from Hamilton, Ontario
People from Burlington, Ontario
Businesspeople from Ontario
1963 births
20th-century Canadian businesspeople
Canadian expatriates in England
21st-century Canadian businesspeople
Lawyers in Ontario
Canadian adoptees
Canadian corporate directors
Canadian business executives
Indigo Books and Music people